The Argonne Building is a historic building located in Des Moines, Iowa, United States. It was built in 1919 and it was used as a  showroom for the Ford automobile plant that was located across the street and for employee housing. In later years it served as a long-term hotel and as an apartment building for low-income renters. There are plans to convert most of the building into market-rate apartments and to maintain the commercial space on the main level. The building was listed on the National Register of Historic Places in 2020.

References

Commercial buildings completed in 1919
Buildings and structures in Des Moines, Iowa
National Register of Historic Places in Des Moines, Iowa
Commercial buildings on the National Register of Historic Places in Iowa